is a Japanese former professional baseball pitcher, and current pitchers coordinator for the Fukuoka SoftBank Hawks of Nippon Professional Baseball (NPB).

He previously played for the Fukuoka Daiei Hawks.

Professional career

Active player era
On November 21, 1997, Hoshino was drafted fourth overall by the Fukuoka Daiei Hawks in the  1997 Nippon Professional Baseball draft.

In 1998 season, he made his Pacific League debut and pitched in two games.

In 1999 season, in the second year of his career,  posting a 10-8 win–loss record and a 3.98 ERA in 21 games pitched, contributed the Fukuoka Daiei Hawks to their first Pacific League championship.

He recorded 13 wins in the 2001 season, his most as a starting pitcher.

In his 11-season career, Hoshino pitched in a total of 156 games, recorded to a 50-48 win–loss record , one hold, and a 4.26 ERA.

He retired during the 2008 season.

After retirement
After his retirement, Hoshino served as assistant conditioning coach for the Fukuoka SoftBank Hawks from the 2009 and 2010 seasons.

He moved to the Hawks' front office in the 2011 season, where he served as a staff member in charge of development, director of development, and head of the development department.

He will serve as the forth squad pitchers coordinator beginning with the 2023 season.

References

External links

 Career statistics - NPB.jp 

1974 births
Living people
Japanese baseball players
Nippon Professional Baseball pitchers
Fukuoka Daiei Hawks players
Fukuoka SoftBank Hawks players
Japanese baseball coaches
Nippon Professional Baseball coaches
Baseball people from Niigata Prefecture